16 Biggest Hits is a series of albums issued by Legacy Recordings, a division of Sony Music.

Notable releases
16 Biggest Hits (Alabama album), 2007
16 Biggest Hits (Lynn Anderson album), 2006
16 Biggest Hits (Clint Black album), 2006
16 Biggest Hits (Johnny Cash album), 1999
16 Biggest Hits (Johnny Cash and June Carter Cash album), 2006
16 Biggest Hits (Charlie Daniels album), 2006
16 Biggest Hits (John Denver album), 2006
16 Biggest Hits (Diamond Rio album), 2008
16 Biggest Hits (Merle Haggard album), 1998
16 Biggest Hits (Alan Jackson album), 2007
16 Biggest Hits (Waylon Jennings album), 2005
16 Biggest Hits (George Jones album), 1998
16 Biggest Hits (Lonestar album), 2006
16 Biggest Hits (Patty Loveless album), 2007
16 Biggest Hits (Ronnie Milsap album), 2007
16 Biggest Hits (Willie Nelson album), 1998
16 Biggest Hits, Volume II (Willie Nelson), 2007
16 Biggest Hits (Roy Orbison album), 1999
16 Biggest Hits (Collin Raye album), 2002
16 Biggest Hits (Ricky Van Shelton album), 1999

References

External links

Compilation album series
Legacy Recordings compilation albums